WSPA-FM (98.9 MHz, "Magic 98.9") is an adult contemporary radio station licensed to serve Spartanburg, South Carolina and covering the Upstate region, including Greenville and Spartanburg. The Audacy, Inc. outlet is licensed by the Federal Communications Commission (FCC) to broadcast at with an ERP of 100 kW. The station goes by the name "Magic 98.9" and its current slogan is '"Today's Hits, Yesterday's Favorites."

WSPA-FM is one of South Carolina's most powerful stations. It provides at least secondary coverage of 94 counties in four states (North Carolina, South Carolina, Georgia and Tennessee). Under the right conditions, it can be heard as far east as Charlotte and as far west as the north Georgia mountains. WSPA is owned by Philadelphia based Audacy, Inc. (formerly Entercom Communications). The transmitter tower (which is visible as far as 35 miles away) is located atop Hogback Mountain, near Landrum. Its studios are in Greenville.

The station's playlist mainly consists of soft rock and pop music from the 1980s through present.

History
WSPA-FM signed on the air August 29, 1946, as the sister station to WSPA AM 950. It was South Carolina's first FM radio station. Also, on August 1, 1960, WSPA-FM became the first station in South Carolina (as well as the Southeast) to broadcast in stereo. WSPA-FM was also the sixth station in the world to broadcast in stereo.

For many years WSPA-FM was a beautiful music station. In February 1991, the station changed to adult contemporary, known then as "Lite-FM 98.9" In 1992, the station became known as "Lite Rock 98.9" with a soft adult contemporary format. Ratings grew under Program Director/PM Drive Host Greg McKinney through 2000. The station switched to "Magic 98.9" in 2002; in recent years the station's sound has moved in a more mainstream AC direction.

WSPA-FM was originally owned by Spartan Radiocasting until selling to Keymarket, who were then taken over by Sinclair Broadcasting in the 1990s and early 2000s until being acquired by Entercom Communications (forerunner to Audacy, Inc.). Notable former air personalities are Rick Woodell and Kimberly Kelly, former morning show hosts until 2005; Stacie Bartro, who hosted afternoons from 2006 to 2013; and Lee Alexander, a staple of upstate radio since the 1970s, working at stations such as WQOK-AM and WFBC-FM, who hosted mid-days at the station for nearly 20 years. The station was the area affiliate for The John Tesh Radio Show until 2016.

In the summer 2008 ratings (12+), WSPA-FM made it to third place, only behind WJMZ-FM and WESC-FM, and frequently enjoys a top five placing in the 12+ Arbitron ratings. Until July 2011, the station competed head-on with Clear Channel Communications' WMYI; that station transitioned to Hot AC, leaving WSPA as the only mainstream adult contemporary station in the market. Every year, around the second week of November, the station transitions to an all-Christmas format, a tradition that began in the early 2000s. The adult contemporary format resumes on December 26.

Prior to 2014, WSPA-FM programming was simulcast in Asheville, North Carolina, via W249AR at 97.7 MHz, mainly to serve areas in the northern part of Asheville that are shielded from the main signal.

On March 6, 2023, Audacy announced that WSPA-FM and WYRD-FM (106.3) would swap formats and call signs beginning March 28. The move is intended to put WYRD-FM's news/talk programming on the larger 98.9 signal.

References

External links

SPA-FM
WSPA-FM
WSPA-FM
Mainstream adult contemporary radio stations in the United States
Audacy, Inc. radio stations
Radio stations established in 1946
1946 establishments in South Carolina